{{DISPLAYTITLE:C22H26N2O5}}
The molecular formula C22H26N2O5 may refer to:

 FV-100, an orally available nucleoside analogue drug with antiviral activity
 Vineridine, a vinca alkaloid

Molecular formulas